Kiss Daddy Goodnight is a 1987 American neo-noir psychological thriller film directed by Peter Ily Huemer. It stars Uma Thurman in her film debut, and Steve Buscemi in a small role.

Plot

Laura is a model who obtains additional income by picking up men, slipping them a mickey, and robbing them. She has a friendship with her neighbor William Tilden. Sid tracks Laura down in search of her ex Johnny, with whom he wishes to start a band.

Cast
 Uma Thurman as Laura
 Paul Dillon as Sid
 Paul Richards as William Tilden
 Steve Buscemi as Johnny
 Annabelle Gurwitch as Sue

References

External links
 
 
 

1987 films
1987 independent films
1980s psychological thriller films
1980s thriller drama films
American independent films
American neo-noir films
American psychological thriller films
American thriller drama films
Films set in New York City
Films shot in New York City
1987 drama films
1980s English-language films
1980s American films